This is a list of the bird species recorded in Argentina. The avifauna of Argentina has 1029 confirmed species, of which 18 are endemic, nine have been introduced by humans, 57 are rare or vagrants, and six are extinct or extirpated. An additional 56 species are hypothetical (see below).

Except as an entry is cited otherwise, the list of species is that of the South American Classification Committee (SACC) of the American Ornithological Society. The list's taxonomic treatment (designation and sequence of orders, families, and species) and nomenclature (common and scientific names) are also those of the SACC.

The following tags have been used to highlight several categories.

 (V) Vagrant - a species that rarely or accidentally occurs in Argentina
 (E) Endemic - a species endemic to Argentina
 (I) Introduced - a species introduced to Argentina as a consequence, direct or indirect, of human actions
 (H) Hypothetical - a species recorded but with "no tangible evidence" according to the SACC

Rheas
Order: StruthioniformesFamily: Rheidae

The rheas are large flightless birds native to South America. Their feet have three toes rather than four which allows them to run faster.

Greater rhea, Rhea americana
Lesser rhea, Rhea pennata

Tinamous
Order: TinamiformesFamily: Tinamidae

The tinamous are one of the most ancient groups of bird. Although they look similar to other ground-dwelling birds like quail and grouse, they have no close relatives and are classified as a single family, Tinamidae, within their own order, the Tinamiformes. They are distantly related to the ratites (order Struthioniformes), that includes the rheas, emus and kiwis.

Solitary tinamou, Tinamus solitarius
Brown tinamou, Crypturellus obsoletus
Undulated tinamou, Crypturellus undulatus
Small-billed tinamou, Crypturellus parvirostris
Tataupa tinamou, Crypturellus tataupa
Red-winged tinamou, Rhynchotus rufescens
Huayco Tinamou, Rhynchotus maculicollis
Ornate tinamou, Nothoprocta ornata
Brushland tinamou, Nothoprocta cinerascens
Andean tinamou, Nothoprocta pentlandii
Darwin's nothura, Nothura darwinii
Spotted nothura, Nothura maculosa
Dwarf tinamou, Taoniscus nanus
Elegant crested-tinamou, Eudromia elegans
Quebracho crested-tinamou, Eudromia formosa
Puna tinamou, Tinamotis pentlandii
Patagonian tinamou, Tinamotis ingoufi

Screamers
Order: AnseriformesFamily: Anhimidae

The screamers are a small family of birds related to the ducks. They are large, bulky birds, with a small downy head, long legs and large feet which are only partially webbed. They have large spurs on their wings which are used in fights over mates and in territorial disputes.

Southern screamer, Chauna torquata

Ducks
Order: AnseriformesFamily: Anatidae

Anatidae includes the ducks and most duck-like waterfowl, such as geese and swans. These birds are adapted to an aquatic existence with webbed feet, flattened bills, and feathers that are excellent at shedding water due to an oily coating.

Fulvous whistling-duck, Dendrocygna bicolor
White-faced whistling-duck, Dendrocygna viduata
Black-bellied whistling-duck, Dendrocygna autumnalis
Graylag goose, Anser anser (I)
Black-necked swan, Cygnus melancoryphus
Coscoroba swan, Coscoroba coscoroba
Orinoco goose, Oressochen jubatus
Andean goose, Oressochen melanopterus
Upland goose, Chloephaga picta
Kelp goose, Chloephaga hybrida
Ashy-headed goose, Chloephaga poliocephala
Ruddy-headed goose, Chloephaga rubidiceps
Muscovy duck, Cairina moschata
Comb duck, Sarkidiornis sylvicola
Ringed teal, Callonetta leucophrys
Brazilian teal, Amazonetta brasiliensis
Torrent duck, Merganetta armata
Flying steamer-duck, Tachyeres patachonicus
Flightless steamer-duck, Tachyeres pteneres
White-headed steamer-duck, Tachyeres leucocephalus (E)
Crested duck, Lophonetta specularioides
Spectacled duck, Speculanas specularis
Puna teal, Spatula puna
Silver teal, Spatula versicolor
Red shoveler, Spatula platalea
Northern shoveler, Spatula clypeata (V)
Blue-winged teal, Spatula discors (V)
Cinnamon teal, Spatula cyanoptera
Chiloe wigeon, Mareca sibilatrix
White-cheeked pintail, Anas bahamensis
Yellow-billed pintail, Anas georgica
Yellow-billed teal, Anas flavirostris
Southern pochard, Netta erythrophthalma (H)
Rosy-billed pochard, Netta peposaca
Brazilian merganser, Mergus octosetaceus (extirpated)
Black-headed duck, Heteronetta atricapilla
Masked duck, Nomonyx dominicus
Ruddy duck, Oxyura jamaicensis
Lake duck, Oxyura vittata

Guans
Order: GalliformesFamily: Cracidae

The Cracidae are large birds, similar in general appearance to turkeys. The guans and curassows live in trees, but the smaller chachalacas are found in more open scrubby habitats. They are generally dull-plumaged, but the curassows and some guans have colorful facial ornaments.

Rusty-margined guan, Penelope superciliaris
Red-faced guan, Penelope dabbenei
Yungas guan, Penelope bridgesi
Dusky-legged guan, Penelope obscura
Black-fronted piping-guan, Pipile jacutinga
Chaco chachalaca, Ortalis canicollis
Bare-faced curassow, Crax fasciolata

New World quails
Order: GalliformesFamily: Odontophoridae

The New World quails are small, plump terrestrial birds only distantly related to the quails of the Old World, but named for their similar appearance and habits.

California quail, Callipepla californica (I)
Spot-winged wood-quail, Odontophorus capueira

Pheasants
Order: GalliformesFamily: Phasianidae

Phasianidae consists of the pheasants and their allies. These are terrestrial species, variable in size but generally plump with broad relatively short wings. Many species are gamebirds or have been domesticated as a food source for humans.

Silver pheasant, Lophura nycthemera (I)

Flamingos
Order: PhoenicopteriformesFamily: Phoenicopteridae

Flamingos filter-feed on shellfish and algae. Their oddly shaped beaks are specially adapted to separate mud and silt from the food they consume and, uniquely, are used upside-down.

Chilean flamingo, Phoenicopterus chilensis
Andean flamingo, Phoenicoparrus andinus
James's flamingo, Phoenicoparrus jamesi

Grebes
Order: PodicipediformesFamily: Podicipedidae

Grebes are small to medium-large freshwater diving birds. They have lobed toes and are excellent swimmers and divers. However, they have their feet placed far back on the body, making them quite ungainly on land.

White-tufted grebe, Rollandia rolland
Least grebe, Tachybaptus dominicus
Pied-billed grebe, Podilymbus podiceps
Great grebe, Podiceps major
Silvery grebe, Podiceps occipitalis
Hooded grebe, Podiceps gallardoi (E)

Pigeons
Order: ColumbiformesFamily: Columbidae

Pigeons and doves are stout-bodied birds with short necks and short slender bills with a fleshy cere.

Rock pigeon, Columba livia (I)
Scaled pigeon, Patagioenas speciosa (V)
Picazuro pigeon, Patagioenas picazuro
Spot-winged pigeon, Patagioenas maculosa
Band-tailed pigeon, Patagioenas fasciata
Chilean pigeon, Patagioenas araucana
Pale-vented pigeon, Patagioenas cayennensis
Plumbeous pigeon, Patagioenas plumbea (V)
Ruddy quail-dove, Geotrygon montana
Violaceous quail-dove, Geotrygon violacea
White-tipped dove, Leptotila verreauxi
Gray-fronted dove, Leptotila rufaxilla
Large-tailed dove, Leptotila megalura
White-throated quail-dove, Zentrygon frenata
West Peruvian dove, Zenaida meloda
Eared dove, Zenaida auriculata
Blue ground dove, Claravis pretiosa
Purple-winged ground dove, Paraclaravis geoffroyi
Bare-faced ground dove, Metriopelia ceciliae
Bare-eyed ground dove, Metriopelia morenoi (E)
Black-winged ground dove, Metriopelia melanoptera
Golden-spotted ground dove, Metriopelia aymara
Plain-breasted ground dove, Columbina minuta (V)
Ruddy ground dove, Columbina talpacoti
Scaled dove, Columbina squammata
Picui ground dove, Columbina picui

Cuckoos
Order: CuculiformesFamily: Cuculidae

The family Cuculidae includes cuckoos, roadrunners and anis. These birds are of variable size with slender bodies, long tails and strong legs. The Old World cuckoos are brood parasites.

Guira cuckoo, Guira guira
Greater ani, Crotophaga major
Smooth-billed ani, Crotophaga ani
Groove-billed ani, Crotophaga sulcirostris (V)
Striped cuckoo, Tapera naevia
Pheasant cuckoo, Dromococcyx phasianellus
Pavonine cuckoo, Dromococcyx pavoninus
Ash-colored cuckoo, Coccycua cinereus
Squirrel cuckoo, Piaya cayana
Dark-billed cuckoo, Coccyzus melacoryphus
Yellow-billed cuckoo, Coccyzus americanus
Pearly-breasted cuckoo, Coccyzus euleri
Black-billed cuckoo, Coccyzus erythropthalmus (V)

Potoos
Order: NyctibiiformesFamily: Nyctibiidae

The potoos (sometimes called poor-me-ones) are large near passerine birds related to the nightjars and frogmouths. They are nocturnal insectivores which lack the bristles around the mouth found in the true nightjars.

Long-tailed potoo, Nyctibius aethereus
Common potoo, Nyctibius griseus

Nightjars
Order: CaprimulgiformesFamily: Caprimulgidae

Nightjars are medium-sized nocturnal birds that usually nest on the ground. They have long wings, short legs, and very short bills. Most have small feet, of little use for walking, and long pointed wings. Their soft plumage is camouflaged to resemble bark or leaves.

Nacunda nighthawk, Chordeiles nacunda
Least nighthawk, Chordeiles pusillus
Lesser nighthawk, Chordeiles acutipennis (H)
Common nighthawk, Chordeiles minor
Short-tailed nighthawk, Lurocalis semitorquatus
Band-winged nightjar, Systellura longirostris
Common pauraque, Nyctidromus albicollis
Sickle-winged nightjar, Eleothreptus anomalus
Lyre-tailed nightjar, Uropsalis lyra
Little nightjar, Setopagis parvulus
Spot-tailed nightjar, Hydropsalis maculicaudus
Scissor-tailed nightjar, Hydropsalis torquata
Long-trained nightjar, Macropsalis forcipata
Ocellated poorwill, Nyctiphrynus ocellatus
Silky-tailed nightjar, Antrostomus sericocaudatus
Rufous nightjar, Antrostomus rufus

Swifts
Order: ApodiformesFamily: Apodidae

Swifts are small birds which spend the majority of their lives flying. These birds have very short legs and never settle voluntarily on the ground, perching instead only on vertical surfaces. Many swifts have long swept-back wings which resemble a crescent or boomerang.

Rothschild's swift, Cypseloides rothschildi
Sooty swift, Cypseloides fumigatus
Great dusky swift, Cypseloides senex
White-collared swift, Streptoprocne zonaris
Biscutate swift, Streptoprocne biscutata
Gray-rumped swift, Chaetura cinereiventris
Chimney swift, Chaetura pelagica (H)
Sick's swift, Chaetura meridionalis
White-tipped swift, Aeronautes montivagus
Andean swift, Aeronautes andecolus
Fork-tailed palm-swift, Tachornis squamata (V)

Hummingbirds
Order: ApodiformesFamily: Trochilidae

Hummingbirds are small birds capable of hovering in mid-air due to the rapid flapping of their wings. They are the only birds that can fly backwards.

White-necked jacobin, Florisuga mellivora (V)
Black jacobin, Florisuga fusca
Planalto hermit, Phaethornis pretrei
Scale-throated hermit, Phaethornis eurynome
Sparkling violetear, Colibri coruscans
White-vented violetear, Colibri serrirostris
White-tailed goldenthroat, Polytmus guainumbi
Ruby-topaz hummingbird, Chrysolampis mosquitus (V)
Black-throated mango, Anthracothorax nigricollis
Green-backed firecrown, Sephanoides sephaniodes
Festive coquette, Lophornis chalybeus (H)
Speckled hummingbird, Adelomyia melanogenys
Red-tailed comet, Sappho sparganurus
Andean hillstar, Oreotrochilus estella
White-sided hillstar, Oreotrochilus leucopleurus
Wedge-tailed hillstar, Oreotrochilus adela
Blue-capped puffleg, Eriocnemis glaucopoides
Giant hummingbird, Patagona gigas
Long-billed starthroat, Heliomaster longirostris(H)
Stripe-breasted starthroat, Heliomaster squamosus (V)
Blue-tufted starthroat, Heliomaster furcifer
Slender-tailed woodstar, Microstilbon burmeisteri
Amethyst woodstar, Calliphlox amethystina
Glittering-bellied emerald, Chlorostilbon lucidus
Purple-crowned plovercrest, Stephanoxis loddigesii
Fork-tailed woodnymph, Thalurania furcata
Violet-capped woodnymph, Thalurania glaucopis
Many-spotted hummingbird, Taphrospilus hypostictus (H)
Swallow-tailed hummingbird, Eupetomena macroura
Versicolored emerald, Chrysuronia versicolor
White-throated hummingbird, Leucochloris albicollis
Sapphire-spangled emerald, Chionomesa lactea (V)
Rufous-throated sapphire, Hylocharis sapphirina (H)
Gilded hummingbird, Hylocharis chrysura
White-bellied hummingbird, Elliotomyia chionogaster
White-chinned sapphire, Chlorestes cyanus (V)

Limpkin
Order: GruiformesFamily: Aramidae

The limpkin resembles a large rail. It has drab-brown plumage and a grayer head and neck.

Limpkin, Aramus guarauna

Rails
Order: GruiformesFamily: Rallidae

Rallidae is a large family of small to medium-sized birds which includes the rails, crakes, coots, and gallinules. Typically they inhabit dense vegetation in damp environments near lakes, swamps or rivers. In general they are shy and secretive birds, making them difficult to observe. Most species have strong legs and long toes which are well adapted to soft uneven surfaces. They tend to have short, rounded wings and to be weak fliers.

Austral rail, Rallus antarcticus
Purple gallinule, Porphyrio martinica
Azure gallinule, Porphyrio flavirostris
Rufous-sided crake, Laterallus melanophaius
Gray-breasted crake, Laterallus exilis
Red-and-white crake, Laterallus leucopyrrhus
Speckled rail, Coturnicops notatus
Ocellated crake, Micropygia schomburgkii
Ash-throated crake, Mustelirallus albicollis
Paint-billed crake, Mustelirallus erythrops
Spotted rail, Pardirallus maculatus
Blackish rail, Pardirallus nigricans
Plumbeous rail, Pardirallus sanguinolentus
Giant wood-rail, Aramides ypecaha
Gray-cowled wood-rail, Aramides cajaneus
Slaty-breasted wood-rail, Aramides saracura
Spot-flanked gallinule, Porphyriops melanops
Yellow-breasted crake, Porzana flaviventer
Dot-winged crake, Porzana spiloptera
Common gallinule, Gallinula galeata
Red-fronted coot, Fulica rufifrons
Horned coot, Fulica cornuta
Giant coot, Fulica gigantea
Red-gartered coot, Fulica armillata
Slate-colored coot, Fulica ardesiaca
White-winged coot, Fulica leucoptera

Finfoots
Order: GruiformesFamily: Heliornithidae

Heliornithidae is a small family of tropical birds with webbed lobes on their feet similar to those of grebes and coots.

Sungrebe, Heliornis fulica

Plovers
Order: CharadriiformesFamily: Charadriidae

The family Charadriidae includes the plovers, dotterels, and lapwings. They are small to medium-sized birds with compact bodies, short, thick necks and long, usually pointed, wings. They are found in open country worldwide, mostly in habitats near water.

American golden-plover, Pluvialis dominica
Black-bellied plover, Pluvialis squatarola
Tawny-throated dotterel, Oreopholus ruficollis
Pied lapwing, Vanellus cayanus (V)
Southern lapwing, Vanellus chilensis
Andean lapwing, Vanellus resplendens
Rufous-chested dotterel, Charadrius modestus
Semipalmated plover, Charadrius semipalmatus
Lesser sand-plover, Charadrius mongolus (V)
Wilson's plover, Charadrius wilsonia (H)
Collared plover, Charadrius collaris
Puna plover, Charadrius alticola
Two-banded plover, Charadrius falklandicus
Diademed sandpiper-plover, Phegornis mitchellii

Oystercatchers
Order: CharadriiformesFamily: Haematopodidae

The oystercatchers are large and noisy plover-like birds, with strong bills used for smashing or prising open molluscs.

American oystercatcher, Haematopus palliatus
Blackish oystercatcher, Haematopus ater
Magellanic oystercatcher, Haematopus leucopodus

Avocets and stilts
Order: CharadriiformesFamily: Recurvirostridae

Recurvirostridae is a family of large wading birds, which includes the avocets and stilts. The avocets have long legs and long up-curved bills. The stilts have extremely long legs and long, thin, straight bills.

Black-necked stilt, Himantopus mexicanus
Andean avocet, Recurvirostra andina

Sheathbills
Order: CharadriiformesFamily: Chionididae

The sheathbills are scavengers of the Antarctic regions. They have white plumage and look plump and dove-like but are believed to be similar to the ancestors of the modern gulls and terns.

Snowy sheathbill, Chionis alba

Magellanic plover
Order: CharadriiformesFamily: Pluvianellidae

The Magellanic plover is a rare wader found only in southernmost South America. In its build and habits it is similar to a turnstone. Its upperparts and breast are pale gray, and the rest of the underparts are white. It has short red legs, a black bill and a red eye. In young birds, the eyes and legs are yellowish.

Magellanic plover, Pluvianellus socialis

Sandpipers
Order: CharadriiformesFamily: Scolopacidae

Scolopacidae is a large diverse family of small to medium-sized shorebirds including the sandpipers, curlews, godwits, shanks, tattlers, woodcocks, snipes, dowitchers, and phalaropes. The majority of these species eat small invertebrates picked out of the mud or soil. Variation in length of legs and bills enables multiple species to feed in the same habitat, particularly on the coast, without direct competition for food.

Upland sandpiper, Bartramia longicauda
Eskimo curlew, Numenius borealis (believed extinct)
Whimbrel, Numenius phaeopus
Eurasian curlew, Numenius arquatus (V)
Hudsonian godwit, Limosa haemastica
Marbled godwit, Limosa fedoa (H)
Ruddy turnstone, Arenaria interpres
Red knot, Calidris canutus
Surfbird, Calidris virgata
Stilt sandpiper, Calidris himantopus
Curlew sandpiper, Calidris ferruginea (V)
Sanderling, Calidris alba
Dunlin, Calidris alpina (H)
Baird's sandpiper, Calidris bairdii
Least sandpiper, Calidris minutilla (V)
White-rumped sandpiper, Calidris fuscicollis
Buff-breasted sandpiper, Calidris subruficollis
Pectoral sandpiper, Calidris melanotos
Semipalmated sandpiper, Calidris pusilla (V)
Short-billed dowitcher, Limnodromus griseus (V)
Long-billed dowitcher, Limnodromus scolopaceus (H)
Fuegian snipe, Gallinago stricklandii
Giant snipe, Gallinago undulata
Pantanal snipe, Gallinago paraguaiaeMagellanic snipe, Gallinago magellanicaPuna snipe, Gallinago andinaWilson's phalarope, Phalaropus tricolorRed-necked phalarope, Phalaropus lobatus (H)
Red phalarope, Phalaropus fulicariusTerek sandpiper, Xenus cinereus (V)
Spotted sandpiper, Actitis maculariaSolitary sandpiper, Tringa solitariaCommon greenshank, Tringa nebularia (H)
Greater yellowlegs, Tringa melanoleucaWillet, Tringa semipalmataLesser yellowlegs, Tringa flavipesSeedsnipes
Order: CharadriiformesFamily: Thinocoridae

The seedsnipes are a small family of birds that superficially resemble sparrows. They have short legs and long wings and are herbivorous waders.

Rufous-bellied seedsnipe, Attagis gayiWhite-bellied seedsnipe, Attagis malouinusGray-breasted seedsnipe, Thinocorus orbignyianusLeast seedsnipe, Thinocorus rumicivorusJacanas
Order: CharadriiformesFamily: Jacanidae

The jacanas are a family of waders found throughout the tropics. They are identifiable by their huge feet and claws which enable them to walk on floating vegetation in the shallow lakes that are their preferred habitat.

Wattled jacana, Jacana jacanaPainted-snipes
Order: CharadriiformesFamily: Rostratulidae

Painted-snipes are short-legged, long-billed birds similar in shape to the true snipes, but more brightly colored.

South American painted-snipe, Rostratula semicollarisSkuas
Order: CharadriiformesFamily: Stercorariidae

The family Stercorariidae are, in general, medium to large birds, typically with gray or brown plumage, often with white markings on the wings. They nest on the ground in temperate and arctic regions and are long-distance migrants.

Chilean skua, Stercorarius chilensisSouth polar skua, Stercorarius maccormickiBrown skua, Stercorarius antarcticusPomarine jaeger, Stercorarius pomarinusParasitic jaeger, Stercorarius parasiticusLong-tailed jaeger, Stercorarius longicaudusSkimmers
Order: CharadriiformesFamily: Rynchopidae

Skimmers are a small family of tropical tern-like birds. They have an elongated lower mandible which they use to feed by flying low over the water surface and skimming the water for small fish.

Black skimmer, Rynchops nigerGulls
Order: CharadriiformesFamily: Laridae

Laridae is a family of medium to large seabirds and includes gulls, terns and skimmers. Gulls are typically gray or white, often with black markings on the head or wings. They have longish bills and webbed feet. Terns are a group of generally medium to large seabirds typically with grey or white plumage, often with black markings on the head. Most terns hunt fish by diving but some pick insects off the surface of fresh water. Terns are generally long-lived birds, with several species known to live in excess of 30 years.

Andean gull, Chroicocephalus serranusBrown-hooded gull, Chroicocephalus maculipennisGray-hooded gull, Chroicocephalus cirrocephalusDolphin gull, Leucophaeus scoresbiiGray gull, Leucophaeus modestus (V)
Franklin's gull, Leucophaeus pipixcanOlrog's gull, Larus atlanticusKelp gull, Larus dominicanusLesser black-backed gull, Larus fuscus (V)
Least tern, Sternula antillarum (V)
Yellow-billed tern, Sternula superciliarisLarge-billed tern, Phaetusa simplexGull-billed tern, Gelochelidon niloticaBlack tern, Chlidonias niger (V)
White-winged tern, Chlidonias leucopterus (V)
Common tern, Sterna hirundoRoseate tern, Sterna dougallii (H)
Arctic tern, Sterna paradisaeaSouth American tern, Sterna hirundinaceaAntarctic tern, Sterna vittata (H)
Forster's tern, Sterna forsteri (H)
Snowy-crowned tern, Sterna trudeauiSandwich tern, Thalasseus sandvicensisRoyal tern, Thalasseus maximusPenguins
Order: SphenisciformesFamily: Spheniscidae

The penguins are a group of aquatic, flightless birds living almost exclusively in the Southern Hemisphere. Most penguins feed on krill, fish, squid and other forms of sealife caught while swimming underwater.

King penguin, Aptenodytes patagonicusEmperor penguin, Aptenodytes forsteri (V)
Gentoo penguin, Pygoscelis papuaChinstrap penguin, Pygoscelis antarcticus (V)
Humboldt penguin, Spheniscus humboldti (H)
Magellanic penguin, Spheniscus magellanicusErect-crested penguin, Eudyptes sclateri (V)
Macaroni penguin, Eudyptes chrysolophus (V)
Rockhopper penguin, Eudyptes chrysocomeSnares penguin, Eudyptes robustus (V)

Albatrosses
Order: ProcellariiformesFamily: Diomedeidae

The albatrosses are among the largest of flying birds, and the great albatrosses from the genus Diomedea have the largest wingspans of any extant birds.

Royal albatross, Diomedea epomophoraWandering albatross, Diomedea exulansSooty albatross, Phoebetria fusca (V)
Light-mantled albatross, Phoebetria palpebrataYellow-nosed albatross, Thalassarche chlororhynchosBlack-browed albatross, Thalassarche melanophrisGray-headed albatross, Thalassarche chrysostomaBuller's albatross, Thalassarche bulleri (V)
White-capped albatross, Thalassarche cautaSalvin's albatross, Thalassarche salvini (V)

Southern storm-petrels
Order: ProcellariiformesFamily: Oceanitidae

The storm-petrels are relatives of the petrels and are the smallest seabirds. They feed on planktonic crustaceans and small fish picked from the surface, typically while hovering. The flight is fluttering and sometimes bat-like.

White-bellied storm-petrel, Fregetta grallaria (H)
Black-bellied storm-petrel, Fregetta tropica (H)
Wilson's storm-petrel, Oceanites oceanicusPincoya storm-petrel, Oceanites pincoyaeGray-backed storm-petrel, Garrodia nereisWhite-faced storm-petrel, Pelagodroma marina (V)

Northern storm-petrels
Order: ProcellariiformesFamily: Hydrobatidae

Though the members of this family are similar in many respects to the southern storm-petrels, including their general appearance and habits, there are enough genetic differences to warrant their placement in a separate family.

Hornby's storm-petrel, Hydrobates hornbyi (V)

Shearwaters
Order: ProcellariiformesFamily: Procellariidae

The procellariids are the main group of medium-sized "true petrels", characterized by united nostrils with medium septum and a long outer functional primary.

Southern giant-petrel, Macronectes giganteusNorthern giant-petrel, Macronectes halliSouthern fulmar, Fulmarus glacialoidesCape petrel, Daption capenseKerguelen petrel, Aphrodroma brevirostrisSoft-plumaged petrel, Pterodroma mollisAtlantic petrel, Pterodroma incerta (H)
White-headed petrel, Pterodroma lessonii (H)
Trindade petrel, Pterodroma arminjoniana (H)
Blue petrel, Halobaena caeruleaFairy prion, Pachyptila turtur (H)
Antarctic prion, Pachyptila desolataSlender-billed prion, Pachyptila belcheriGray petrel, Procellaria cinerea (V)
White-chinned petrel, Procellaria aequinoctialisSpectacled petrel, Procellaria conspicillataParkinson's petrel, Procellaria parkinsoni (H)
Westland petrel, Procellaria westlandica (V)
Cory's shearwater, Calonectris diomedeaCape Verde shearwater, Calonectris edwardsiiSooty shearwater, Ardenna griseaGreat shearwater, Ardenna gravisPink-footed shearwater, Ardenna creatopus (V)
Manx shearwater, Puffinus puffinusLittle shearwater, Puffinus assimilisCommon diving-petrel, Pelecanoides urinatrixSouth Georgia diving-petrel, Pelecanoides georgicus (H)
Magellanic diving-petrel, Pelecanoides magellaniStorks
Order: CiconiiformesFamily: Ciconiidae

Storks are large, long-legged, long-necked, wading birds with long, stout bills. Storks are mute, but bill-clattering is an important mode of communication at the nest. Their nests can be large and may be reused for many years. Many species are migratory.

Maguari stork, Ciconia maguariJabiru, Jabiru mycteriaWood stork, Mycteria americanaFrigatebirds
Order: SuliformesFamily: Fregatidae

Frigatebirds are large seabirds usually found over tropical oceans. They are large, black-and-white or completely black, with long wings and deeply forked tails. The males have colored inflatable throat pouches. They do not swim or walk and cannot take off from a flat surface. Having the largest wingspan-to-body-weight ratio of any bird, they are essentially aerial, able to stay aloft for more than a week.

Magnificent frigatebird, Fregata magnificensBoobies
Order: SuliformesFamily: Sulidae

The sulids comprise the gannets and boobies. Both groups are medium to large coastal seabirds that plunge-dive for fish.

Cape gannet, Morus capensis (V)
Peruvian booby, Sula variegata (H)
Brown booby, Sula leucogaster (V)

Anhingas
Order: SuliformesFamily: Anhingidae

Anhingas are often called "snake-birds" because of their long thin neck, which gives a snake-like appearance when they swim with their bodies submerged. The males have black and dark-brown plumage, an erectile crest on the nape and a larger bill than the female. The females have much paler plumage especially on the neck and underparts. The darters have completely webbed feet and their legs are short and set far back on the body. Their plumage is somewhat permeable, like that of cormorants, and they spread their wings to dry after diving.

Anhinga, Anhinga anhingaCormorants
Order: SuliformesFamily: Phalacrocoracidae

Phalacrocoracidae is a family of medium to large coastal, fish-eating seabirds that includes cormorants and shags. Plumage coloration varies, with the majority having mainly dark plumage, some species being black-and-white, and a few being colorful.

Red-legged cormorant, Phalacrocorax gaimardiNeotropic cormorant, Phalacrocorax brasilianusMagellanic cormorant, Phalacrocorax magellanicusGuanay cormorant, Phalacrocorax bougainvilliiImperial cormorant, Phalacrocorax atricepsPelicans
Order: PelecaniformesFamily: Pelecanidae

Pelicans are large water birds with a distinctive pouch under their beak. As with other members of the order Pelecaniformes, they have webbed feet with four toes.

Peruvian pelican, Pelecanus thagus (V)

Herons
Order: PelecaniformesFamily: Ardeidae

The family Ardeidae contains the bitterns, herons and egrets. Herons and egrets are medium to large wading birds with long necks and legs. Bitterns tend to be shorter necked and more wary. Members of Ardeidae fly with their necks retracted, unlike other long-necked birds such as storks, ibises and spoonbills.

Rufescent tiger-heron, Tigrisoma lineatumFasciated tiger-heron, Tigrisoma fasciatumBoat-billed heron, Cochlearius cochleariusPinnated bittern, Botaurus pinnatusLeast bittern, Ixobrychus exilisStripe-backed bittern, Ixobrychus involucrisBlack-crowned night-heron, Nycticorax nycticoraxYellow-crowned night-heron, Nyctanassa violacea (V)
Green heron, Butorides virescens (H)
Striated heron, Butorides striataCattle egret, Bubulcus ibisCocoi heron, Ardea cocoiGreat egret, Ardea albaWhistling heron, Syrigma sibilatrixCapped heron, Pilherodius pileatus (V)
Snowy egret, Egretta thulaLittle blue heron, Egretta caeruleaIbises
Order: PelecaniformesFamily: Threskiornithidae

Threskiornithidae is a family of large terrestrial and wading birds which includes the ibises and spoonbills. They have long, broad wings with 11 primary and about 20 secondary feathers. They are strong fliers and despite their size and weight, very capable soarers.

Scarlet ibis, Eudocimus ruber (H)
White-faced ibis, Plegadis chihiPuna ibis, Plegadis ridgwayiGreen ibis, Mesembrinibis cayennensisBare-faced ibis, Phimosus infuscatusPlumbeous ibis, Theristicus caerulescensBuff-necked ibis, Theristicus caudatusAndean ibis, Theristicus branickii (V)
Black-faced ibis, Theristicus melanopisRoseate spoonbill, Platalea ajajaNew World vultures
Order: CathartiformesFamily: Cathartidae

The New World vultures are not closely related to Old World vultures, but superficially resemble them because of convergent evolution. Like the Old World vultures, they are scavengers. However, unlike Old World vultures, which find carcasses by sight, New World vultures have a good sense of smell with which they locate carrion.

King vulture, Sarcoramphus papaAndean condor, Vultur gryphusBlack vulture, Coragyps atratusTurkey vulture, Cathartes auraLesser yellow-headed vulture, Cathartes burrovianusGreater yellow-headed vulture, Cathartes melambrotusOsprey
Order: AccipitriformesFamily: Pandionidae

The family Pandionidae contains only one species, the osprey. The osprey is a medium-large raptor which is a specialist fish-eater with a worldwide distribution.

Osprey, Pandion haliaetusHawks
Order: AccipitriformesFamily: Accipitridae

Accipitridae is a family of birds of prey, which includes hawks, eagles, kites, harriers, and Old World vultures. These birds have powerful hooked beaks for tearing flesh from their prey, strong legs, powerful talons, and keen eyesight.

Pearl kite, Gampsonyx swainsoniiWhite-tailed kite, Elanus leucurusHook-billed kite, Chondrohierax uncinatusGray-headed kite, Leptodon cayanensisSwallow-tailed kite, Elanoides forficatusCrested eagle, Morphnus guianensisHarpy eagle, Harpia harpyjaBlack hawk-eagle, Spizaetus tyrannusBlack-and-white hawk-eagle, Spizaetus melanoleucusOrnate hawk-eagle, Spizaetus ornatusBlack-and-chestnut eagle, Spizaetus isidoriBlack-collared hawk, Busarellus nigricollisSnail kite, Rostrhamus sociabilisRufous-thighed kite, Harpagus diodonMississippi kite, Ictinia mississippiensisPlumbeous kite, Ictinia plumbeaCinereous harrier, Circus cinereusLong-winged harrier, Circus buffoniGray-bellied hawk, Accipiter poliogasterSharp-shinned hawk, Accipiter striatusBicolored hawk, Accipiter bicolorTiny hawk, Microspizias superciliosusCrane hawk, Geranospiza caerulescensSavanna hawk, Buteogallus meridionalisGreat black hawk, Buteogallus urubitingaSolitary eagle, Buteogallus solitariusChaco eagle, Buteogallus coronatusRoadside hawk, Rupornis magnirostrisHarris's hawk, Parabuteo unicinctusWhite-rumped hawk, Parabuteo leucorrhousWhite-tailed hawk, Geranoaetus albicaudatusVariable hawk, Geranoaetus polyosomaBlack-chested buzzard-eagle, Geranoaetus melanoleucusMantled hawk, Pseudastur polionotusGray-lined hawk, Buteo nitidusBroad-winged hawk, Buteo platypterusWhite-throated hawk, Buteo albigulaShort-tailed hawk, Buteo brachyurusSwainson's hawk, Buteo swainsoniZone-tailed hawk, Buteo albonotatusRufous-tailed hawk, Buteo ventralisBarn owls
Order: StrigiformesFamily: Tytonidae

Barn owls are medium to large owls with large heads and characteristic heart-shaped faces. They have long strong legs with powerful talons.

Barn owl, Tyto albaOwls
Order: StrigiformesFamily: Strigidae

The typical owls are small to large solitary nocturnal birds of prey. They have large forward-facing eyes and ears, a hawk-like beak and a conspicuous circle of feathers around each eye called a facial disk.

Tropical screech-owl, Megascops cholibaMontane forest screech-owl, Megascops hoyiLong-tufted screech-owl, Megascops sanctaecatarinaeBlack-capped screech-owl, Megascops atricapillaSpectacled owl, Pulsatrix perspicillataTawny-browed owl, Pulsatrix koeniswaldianaGreat horned owl, Bubo virginianusRusty-barred owl, Strix hylophilaChaco owl, Strix chacoensisRufous-legged owl, Strix rufipesMottled owl, Strix virgataBlack-banded owl, Strix huhulaYungas pygmy-owl, Glaucidium bolivianumFerruginous pygmy-owl, Glaucidium brasilianumAustral pygmy-owl, Glaucidium nanaBurrowing owl, Athene cuniculariaBuff-fronted owl, Aegolius harrisiiStriped owl, Asio clamatorStygian owl, Asio stygiusShort-eared owl, Asio flammeusTrogons
Order: TrogoniformesFamily: Trogonidae

The family Trogonidae includes trogons and quetzals. Found in tropical woodlands worldwide, they feed on insects and fruit, and their broad bills and weak legs reflect their diet and arboreal habits. Although their flight is fast, they are reluctant to fly any distance. Trogons have soft, often colorful, feathers with distinctive male and female plumage.

Blue-crowned trogon, Trogon curucuiSurucua trogon, Trogon surrucuraBlack-throated trogon, Trogon rufus  (see note)

Motmots
Order: CoraciiformesFamily: Momotidae

The motmots have colorful plumage and long, graduated tails which they display by waggling back and forth. In most of the species, the barbs near the ends of the two longest (central) tail feathers are weak and fall off, leaving a length of bare shaft and creating a racket-shaped tail.

Rufous-capped motmot, Baryphthengus ruficapillusAmazonian motmot, Momotus momotaKingfishers
Order: CoraciiformesFamily: Alcedinidae

Kingfishers are medium-sized birds with large heads, long, pointed bills, short legs, and stubby tails.

Ringed kingfisher, Megaceryle torquatusAmazon kingfisher, Chloroceryle amazonaAmerican pygmy kingfisher, Chloroceryle aeneaGreen kingfisher, Chloroceryle americanaGreen-and-rufous kingfisher, Chloroceryle inda (H)

Jacamars
Order: GalbuliformesFamily: Galbulidae

The jacamars are near passerine birds from tropical South America, with a range that extends up to Mexico. They feed on insects caught on the wing, and are glossy, elegant birds with long bills and tails. In appearance and behavior they resemble the Old World bee-eaters, although they are more closely related to puffbirds.

Rufous-tailed jacamar, Galbula ruficauda (H)

Puffbirds
Order: GalbuliformesFamily: Bucconidae

The puffbirds are related to the jacamars and have the same range, but lack the iridescent colors of that family. They are mainly brown, rufous or gray, with large heads and flattened bills with hooked tips. The loose abundant plumage and short tails makes them look stout and puffy, giving rise to the English common name of the family.

Buff-bellied puffbird, Notharchus swainsoniWhite-eared puffbird, Nystalus chacuruSpot-backed puffbird, Nystalus maculatusRusty-breasted nunlet, Nonnula rubeculaToucans
Order: PiciformesFamily: Ramphastidae

Toucans are near passerine birds from the Neotropics. They are brightly marked and have enormous, colorful bills which in some species amount to half their body length.

Toco toucan, Ramphastos tocoRed-breasted toucan, Ramphastos dicolorusSpot-billed toucanet, Selenidera maculirostrisSaffron toucanet, Pteroglossus bailloniChestnut-eared aracari, Pteroglossus castanotisWoodpeckers
Order: PiciformesFamily: Picidae

Woodpeckers are small to medium-sized birds with chisel-like beaks, short legs, stiff tails, and long tongues used for capturing insects. Some species have feet with two toes pointing forward and two backward, while several species have only three toes. Many woodpeckers have the habit of tapping noisily on tree trunks with their beaks.

White-barred piculet, Picumnus cirratusOchre-collared piculet, Picumnus temminckiiWhite-wedged piculet, Picumnus albosquamatusMottled piculet, Picumnus nebulosusWhite woodpecker, Melanerpes candidusYellow-fronted woodpecker, Melanerpes flavifronsWhite-fronted woodpecker, Melanerpes cactorumSmoky-brown woodpecker, Dryobates  fumigatusWhite-spotted woodpecker, Dryobates spilogasterCheckered woodpecker, Dryobates mixtusStriped woodpecker, Dryobates lignariusLittle woodpecker, Dryobates passerinusDot-fronted woodpecker, Dryobates frontalisRobust woodpecker, Campephilus robustusCrimson-crested woodpecker, Campephilus melanoleucosCream-backed woodpecker, Campephilus leucopogonMagellanic woodpecker, Campephilus magellanicusLineated woodpecker, Dryocopus lineatusBlack-bodied woodpecker, Dryocopus schulziHelmeted woodpecker, Celeus galeatusPale-crested woodpecker, Celeus lugubrisBlond-crested woodpecker, Celeus flavescensGolden-green woodpecker, Piculus chrysochlorosWhite-browed woodpecker, Piculus aurulentusGolden-olive woodpecker, Colaptes rubiginosusGreen-barred woodpecker, Colaptes melanochlorosChilean flicker, Colaptes pitiusAndean flicker, Colaptes rupicolaCampo flicker, Colaptes campestrisSeriemas
Order: CariamiformesFamily: Cariamidae

The seriemas are terrestrial birds which run rather than fly (though they are able to fly for short distances). They have long legs, necks and tails, but only short wings, reflecting their way of life. They are brownish birds with short bills and erectile crests, found on fairly-dry open grasslands.

Red-legged seriema, Cariama cristataBlack-legged seriema, Chunga burmeisteriFalcons
Order: FalconiformesFamily: Falconidae

Falconidae is a family of diurnal birds of prey. They differ from hawks, eagles and kites in that they kill with their beaks instead of their talons.

Laughing falcon, Herpetotheres cachinnansBarred forest-falcon, Micrastur ruficollisCollared forest-falcon, Micrastur semitorquatusSpot-winged falconet, Spiziapteryx circumcinctaCrested caracara, Caracara plancusMountain caracara, Phalcoboenus megalopterusWhite-throated caracara, Phalcoboenus albogularisStriated caracara, Phalcoboenus australisYellow-headed caracara, Milvago chimachimaChimango caracara, Milvago chimangoAmerican kestrel, Falco sparveriusBat falcon, Falco rufigularisOrange-breasted falcon, Falco deiroleucusAplomado falcon, Falco femoralisPeregrine falcon, Falco peregrinusNew World and African parrots
Order: PsittaciformesFamily: Psittacidae

Parrots are small to large birds with a characteristic curved beak. Their upper mandibles have slight mobility in the joint with the skull and they have a generally erect stance. All parrots are zygodactyl, having the four toes on each foot placed two at the front and two to the back.

Gray-hooded parakeet, Psilopsiagon aymaraMountain parakeet, Psilopsiagon aurifronsAndean parakeet, Bolborhynchus orbygnesiusMonk parakeet, Myiopsitta monachusYellow-chevroned parakeet, Brotogeris chiririPileated parrot, Pionopsitta pileataBlue-bellied parrot, Triclaria malachitacea (H)
Scaly-headed parrot, Pionus maximilianiVinaceous-breasted parrot, Amazona vinaceaTucuman parrot, Amazona tucumanaRed-spectacled parrot, Amazona pretrei (H)
Turquoise-fronted parrot, Amazona aestivaScaly-naped parrot, Amazona mercenarius (V)
Cobalt-rumped parrotlet, Forpus xanthopterygiusBlaze-winged parakeet, Pyrrhura devillei (H)
Maroon-bellied parakeet, Pyrrhura frontalisGreen-cheeked parakeet, Pyrrhura molinaeAustral parakeet, Enicognathus ferrugineusSlender-billed parakeet, Enicognathus leptorhynchus (V)
Burrowing parakeet, Cyanoliseus patagonusGlaucous macaw, Anodorhynchus glaucus (possibly extinct)
Peach-fronted parakeet, Eupsittula aureaNanday parakeet, Aratinga nendayBlue-winged macaw, Primolius maracana (extirpated)
Yellow-collared macaw, Primolius auricollisBlue-and-yellow macaw, Ara ararauna (H)
Military macaw, Ara militarisRed-and-green macaw, Ara chloropterus (extirpated)
Blue-crowned parakeet, Thectocercus acuticaudatusMitred parakeet, Psittacara mitratusWhite-eyed parakeet, Psittacara leucophthalmusAntbirds
Order: PasseriformesFamily: Thamnophilidae

The antbirds are a large family of small passerine birds of subtropical and tropical Central and South America. They are forest birds which tend to feed on insects at or near the ground. A sizable minority of them specialize in following columns of army ants to eat small invertebrates that leave their hiding places to flee from the ants. Many species lack bright color; brown, black, and white are the dominant tones.

Spot-backed antshrike, Hypoedaleus guttatusGiant antshrike, Batara cinereaLarge-tailed antshrike, Mackenziaena leachiiTufted antshrike, Mackenziaena severaGreat antshrike, Taraba majorWhite-bearded antshrike, Biatas nigropectusBarred antshrike, Thamnophilus doliatusRufous-capped antshrike, Thamnophilus ruficapillusVariable antshrike, Thamnophilus caerulescensPlain antvireo, Dysithamnus mentalisBlack-capped antwren, Herpsilochmus atricapillusRusty-winged antwren, Herpsilochmus rufimarginatusStripe-backed antbird, Myrmorchilus strigilatusBertoni's antbird, Drymophila rubricollisDusky-tailed antbird, Drymophila maluraStreak-capped antwren, Terenura maculataWhite-shouldered fire-eye, Pyriglena leucopteraCrescentchests
Order: PasseriformesFamily: Melanopareiidae

These are smallish birds which inhabit regions of arid scrub. They have a band across the chest which gives them their name.

Collared crescentchest, Melanopareia torquata (H)
Olive-crowned crescentchest, Melanopareia maximilianiGnateaters
Order: PasseriformesFamily: Conopophagidae

The gnateaters are round, short-tailed and long-legged birds, which are closely related to the antbirds.

Rufous gnateater, Conopophaga lineataAntpittas
Order: PasseriformesFamily: Grallariidae

The members of this small family are found across northern South America and into Central America. They are forest birds, usually seen on the ground or in the low understory.

Variegated antpitta, Grallaria variaWhite-throated antpitta, Grallaria albigulaSpeckle-breasted antpitta, Cryptopezus nattereriTapaculos
Order: PasseriformesFamily: Rhinocryptidae

The tapaculos are small suboscine passeriform birds with numerous species in South and Central America. They are terrestrial species that fly only poorly on their short wings. They have strong legs, well-suited to their habitat of grassland or forest undergrowth. The tail is cocked and pointed towards the head.

Spotted bamboowren, Psilorhamphus guttatusCrested gallito, Rhinocrypta lanceolataSandy gallito, Teledromas fuscus (E)
Chestnut-throated huet-huet, Pteroptochos castaneusBlack-throated huet-huet, Pteroptochos tarniiChucao tapaculo, Scelorchilus rubeculaOchre-flanked tapaculo, Eugralla paradoxaPlanalto tapaculo, Scytalopus pachecoiMagellanic tapaculo, Scytalopus magellanicusZimmer's tapaculo, Scytalopus zimmeriWhite-browed tapaculo, Scytalopus superciliaris (E)

Antthrushes
Order: PasseriformesFamily: Formicariidae

Antthrushes resemble small rails with strong, longish legs, very short tails, and stout bills.

Short-tailed antthrush, Chamaeza campanisonaRufous-tailed antthrush, Chamaeza ruficaudaOvenbirds
Order: PasseriformesFamily: Furnariidae

Ovenbirds comprise a large family of small sub-oscine passerine bird species found in Central and South America. They are a diverse group of insectivores which gets its name from the elaborate "oven-like" clay nests built by some species, although others build stick nests or nest in tunnels or clefts in rock. The woodcreepers are brownish birds which maintain an upright vertical posture, supported by their stiff tail vanes. They feed mainly on insects taken from tree trunks.

Rufous-breasted leaftosser, Sclerurus scansorSlender-billed miner, Geositta tenuirostrisCommon miner, Geositta cuniculariaPuna miner, Geositta punensisRufous-banded miner, Geositta rufipennisShort-billed miner, Geositta antarcticaCreamy-rumped miner, Geositta isabellinaOlivaceous woodcreeper, Sittasomus griseicapillusPlain-winged woodcreeper, Dendrocincla turdinaBlack-banded woodcreeper, Dendrocolaptes picumnusPlanalto woodcreeper, Dendrocolaptes platyrostrisWhite-throated woodcreeper, Xiphocolaptes albicollisGreat rufous woodcreeper, Xiphocolaptes majorLesser woodcreeper, Xiphorhynchus fuscusRed-billed scythebill, Campylorhamphus trochilirostrisBlack-billed scythebill, Campylorhamphus falculariusScimitar-billed woodcreeper, Drymornis bridgesiiNarrow-billed woodcreeper, Lepidocolaptes angustirostrisScalloped woodcreeper, Lepidocolaptes falcinellusPlain xenops, Xenops minutusStreaked xenops, Xenops rutilansWhite-throated treerunner, Pygarrhichas albogularisRock earthcreeper, Ochetorhynchus andaecolaStraight-billed earthcreeper, Ochetorhynchus ruficaudusBand-tailed earthcreeper, Ochetorhynchus phoenicurusBolivian earthcreeper, Tarphonomus hartertiChaco earthcreeper, Tarphonomus certhioidesRufous hornero, Furnarius rufusCrested hornero, Furnarius cristatusSharp-tailed streamcreeper, Lochmias nematuraWren-like rushbird, Phleocryptes melanopsCurve-billed reedhaunter, Limnornis curvirostrisPatagonian forest earthcreeper, Upucerthia saturatiorScale-throated earthcreeper, Upucerthia dumetariaBuff-breasted earthcreeper, Upucerthia validirostrisBuff-winged cinclodes, Cinclodes fuscusBlackish cinclodes, Cinclodes antarcticusCordoba cinclodes, Cinclodes comechingonus (E)
Olrog's cinclodes, Cinclodes olrogi (E)
Cream-winged cinclodes, Cinclodes albiventrisGray-flanked cinclodes, Cinclodes oustaletiWhite-winged cinclodes, Cinclodes atacamensisDark-bellied cinclodes, Cinclodes patagonicusSharp-billed treehunter, Heliobletus contaminatusBlack-capped foliage-gleaner, Philydor atricapillusWhite-browed foliage-gleaner, Anabacerthia amaurotisOchre-breasted foliage-gleaner, Anabacerthia lichtensteiniBuff-browed foliage-gleaner, Syndactyla rufosuperciliataBuff-fronted foliage-gleaner, Dendroma rufaCanebrake groundcreeper, Clibanornis dendrocolaptoidesWhite-eyed foliage-gleaner, Automolus leucophthalmusPearled treerunner, Margarornis squamiger (H)
Thorn-tailed rayadito, Aphrastura spinicaudaDes Murs's wiretail, Sylviorthorhynchus desmursiiTawny tit-spinetail, Sylviorthorhynchus yanacensisBrown-capped tit-spinetail, Leptasthenura fuliginicepsTufted tit-spinetail, Leptasthenura platensisPlain-mantled tit-spinetail, Leptasthenura aegithaloidesAraucaria tit-spinetail, Leptasthenura setariaRufous-fronted thornbird, Phacellodomus rufifronsStreak-fronted thornbird, Phacellodomus striaticepsLittle thornbird, Phacellodomus sibilatrixSpot-breasted thornbird, Phacellodomus maculipectusFreckle-breasted thornbird, Phacellodomus striaticollisGreater thornbird, Phacellodomus ruberOrange-breasted thornbird, Phacellodomus ferrugineigula (H)
Firewood-gatherer, Anumbius annumbiLark-like brushrunner, Coryphistera alaudinaCreamy-breasted canastero, Asthenes dorbignyiShort-billed canastero, Asthenes baeriHudson's canastero, Asthenes hudsoniAustral canastero, Asthenes anthoidesScribble-tailed canastero, Asthenes maculicaudaPuna canastero, Asthenes sclateriCordilleran canastero, Asthenes modestaSharp-billed canastero, Asthenes pyrrholeucaMaquis canastero, Asthenes heteruraStraight-billed reedhaunter, Limnoctites rectirostrisSulphur-bearded reedhaunter, Limnoctites sulphuriferusStripe-crowned spinetail, Cranioleuca pyrrhophiaOlive spinetail, Cranioleuca obsoletaPatagonian canastero, Pseudasthenes patagonica (E)
Steinbach's canastero, Pseudasthenes steinbachi (E)
Bay-capped wren-spinetail, Spartonoica maluroidesBrown cacholote, Pseudoseisura lophotesWhite-throated cacholote, Pseudoseisura gutturalis (E)
Yellow-chinned spinetail, Certhiaxis cinnamomeusChotoy spinetail, Schoeniophylax phryganophilusOchre-cheeked spinetail, Synallaxis scutataGray-bellied spinetail, Synallaxis cinerascensRufous-capped spinetail, Synallaxis ruficapillaSpix's spinetail, Synallaxis spixiPale-breasted spinetail, Synallaxis albescensSooty-fronted spinetail, Synallaxis frontalisAzara's spinetail, Synallaxis azaraeManakins
Order: PasseriformesFamily: Pipridae

The manakins are a family of subtropical and tropical mainland Central and South America, and Trinidad and Tobago. They are compact forest birds, the males typically being brightly colored, although the females of most species are duller and usually green-plumaged. Manakins feed on small fruits, berries, and insects.

Yungas manakin, Chiroxiphia bolivianaSwallow-tailed manakin, Chiroxiphia caudataWhite-bearded manakin, Manacus manacusBand-tailed manakin, Pipra fasciicaudaCotingas
Order: PasseriformesFamily: Cotingidae

The cotingas are birds of forests or forest edges in tropical South America. Comparatively little is known about this diverse group, although all have broad bills with hooked tips, rounded wings, and strong legs. The males of many of the species are brightly colored or decorated with plumes or wattles.

White-tipped plantcutter, Phytotoma rutilaRufous-tailed plantcutter, Phytotoma raraSwallow-tailed cotinga, Phibalura flavirostrisRed-ruffed fruitcrow, Pyroderus scutatusBare-throated bellbird, Procnias nudicollisTityras
Order: PasseriformesFamily: Tityridae

Tityridae are suboscine passerine birds found in forest and woodland in the Neotropics. The species in this family were formerly spread over the families Tyrannidae, Pipridae, and Cotingidae. They are small to medium-sized birds. They do not have the sophisticated vocal capabilities of the songbirds. Most, but not all, have plain coloring.

Black-crowned tityra, Tityra inquisitorBlack-tailed tityra, Tityra cayanaMasked tityra, Tityra semifasciataGreenish schiffornis, Schiffornis virescensWhite-naped xenopsaris, Xenopsaris albinuchaGreen-backed becard, Pachyramphus viridisChestnut-crowned becard, Pachyramphus castaneusWhite-winged becard, Pachyramphus polychopterusCrested becard, Pachyramphus validusSharpbill
Order: PasseriformesFamily: Oxyruncidae

The sharpbill is a small bird of dense forests in Central and South America. It feeds mostly on fruit but also eats insects.

Sharpbill, Oxyruncus cristatusTyrant flycatchers
Order: PasseriformesFamily: Tyrannidae

Tyrant flycatchers are passerine birds which occur throughout North and South America. They superficially resemble the Old World flycatchers, but are more robust and have stronger bills. They do not have the sophisticated vocal capabilities of the songbirds. Most, but not all, have plain coloring. As the name implies, most are insectivorous.

Wing-barred piprites, Piprites chlorisBlack-capped piprites, Piprites pileataWhite-throated spadebill, Platyrinchus mystaceusRusset-winged spadebill, Platyrinchus leucoryphus (H)
Southern antpipit, Corythopis delalandiSouthern bristle-tyrant, Phylloscartes eximiusMottle-cheeked tyrannulet, Phylloscartes ventralisSão Paulo tyrannulet, Phylloscartes paulistaBay-ringed tyrannulet, Phylloscartes sylviolusGray-hooded flycatcher, Mionectes rufiventrisSepia-capped flycatcher, Leptopogon amaurocephalusYellow-olive flycatcher, Tolmomyias sulphurescensEared pygmy-tyrant, Myiornis auricularisDrab-breasted pygmy-tyrant, Hemitriccus diopsBrown-breasted pygmy-tyrant, Hemitriccus obsoletusPearly-vented tody-tyrant, Hemitriccus margaritaceiventerOchre-faced tody-flycatcher, Poecilotriccus plumbeicepsCommon tody-flycatcher, Todirostrum cinereumCliff flycatcher, Hirundinea ferrugineaCinnamon flycatcher, Pyrrhomyias cinnamomeusGreater wagtail-tyrant, Stigmatura budytoidesPlain tyrannulet, Inezia inornataFulvous-crowned scrub-tyrant, Euscarthmus meloryphusSouthern beardless-tyrannulet, Camptostoma obsoletumYellow-bellied elaenia, Elaenia flavogasterLarge elaenia, Elaenia spectabilisWhite-crested elaenia, Elaenia albicepsSmall-billed elaenia, Elaenia parvirostrisOlivaceous elaenia, Elaenia mesoleucaSlaty elaenia, Elaenia streperaLesser elaenia, Elaenia chiriquensisHighland elaenia, Elaenia obscuraSmall-headed elaenia, Elaenia sordidaGray elaenia, Myiopagis canicepsGreenish elaenia, Myiopagis viridicataSuiriri flycatcher, Suiriri suiririYellow tyrannulet, Capsiempis flaveolaRough-legged tyrannulet, Phyllomyias burmeisteriGreenish tyrannulet, Phyllomyias virescensSclater's tyrannulet, Phyllomyias sclateriPlanalto tyrannulet, Phyllomyias fasciatusTawny-rumped tyrannulet, Phyllomyias uropygialis (H)
Mouse-colored tyrannulet, Phaeomyias murinaBuff-banded tyrannulet, Mecocerculus hellmayriWhite-throated tyrannulet, Mecocerculus leucophrysYellow-billed tit-tyrant, Anairetes flavirostrisTufted tit-tyrant, Anairetes parulusBearded tachuri, Polystictus pectoralisSharp-tailed tyrant, Culicivora caudacutaCrested doradito, Pseudocolopteryx sclateriSubtropical doradito, Pseudocolopteryx acutipennisDinelli's doradito, Pseudocolopteryx dinellianaWarbling doradito, Pseudocolopteryx flaviventrisTicking doradito, Pseudocolopteryx citreolaSooty tyrannulet, Serpophaga nigricansWhite-crested tyrannulet, Serpophaga subcristataWhite-bellied tyrannulet, Serpophaga mundaStraneck's tyrannulet, Serpophaga griseicapillaRufous-tailed attila, Attila phoenicurusPiratic flycatcher, Legatus leucophaiusLarge-headed flatbill, Ramphotrigon megacephalumGreat kiskadee, Pitangus sulphuratusLesser kiskadee, Philohydor lictor (V)
Cattle tyrant, Machetornis rixosaBoat-billed flycatcher, Megarynchus pitanguaGolden-crowned flycatcher, Myiodynastes chrysocephalusStreaked flycatcher, Myiodynastes maculatusSocial flycatcher, Myiozetetes similisThree-striped flycatcher, Conopias trivirgatusVariegated flycatcher, Empidonomus variusCrowned slaty flycatcher, Empidonomus aurantioatrocristatusWhite-throated kingbird, Tyrannus albogularis (H)
Tropical kingbird, Tyrannus melancholicusFork-tailed flycatcher, Tyrannus savanaEastern kingbird, Tyrannus tyrannusRufous casiornis, Casiornis rufusSibilant sirystes, Sirystes sibilatorDusky-capped flycatcher, Myiarchus tuberculiferSwainson's flycatcher, Myiarchus swainsoniShort-crested flycatcher, Myiarchus feroxBrown-crested flycatcher, Myiarchus tyrannulusLong-tailed tyrant, Colonia colonusBran-colored flycatcher, Myiophobus fasciatusPatagonian tyrant, Colorhamphus parvirostrisd'Orbigny's chat-tyrant, Ochthoeca oenanthoidesWhite-browed chat-tyrant, Ochthoeca leucophrysSouthern scrub-flycatcher, Sublegatus modestusVermilion flycatcher, Pyrocephalus rubinusBlack-backed water-tyrant, Fluvicola albiventerMasked water-tyrant, Fluvicola nengetaWhite-headed marsh tyrant, Arundinicola leucocephalaStreamer-tailed tyrant, Gubernetes yetapaBlack-and-white monjita, Heteroxolmis dominicanusCock-tailed tyrant, Alectrurus tricolor (Extirpated)
Strange-tailed tyrant, Alectrurus risoraAustral negrito, Lessonia rufaAndean negrito, Lessonia oreasSpectacled tyrant, Hymenops perspicillatusPlumbeous black-tyrant, Knipolegus cabanisiBlue-billed black-tyrant, Knipolegus cyanirostrisCinereous tyrant, Knipolegus striaticepsWhite-winged black-tyrant, Knipolegus aterrimusHudson's black-tyrant, Knipolegus hudsoniYellow-browed tyrant, Satrapa icterophrysSpot-billed ground-tyrant, Muscisaxicola maculirostrisPuna ground-tyrant, Muscisaxicola juninensisCinereous ground-tyrant, Muscisaxicola cinereusOchre-naped ground-tyrant, Muscisaxicola flavinuchaRufous-naped ground-tyrant, Muscisaxicola rufivertexDark-faced ground-tyrant, Muscisaxicola maclovianusWhite-browed ground-tyrant, Muscisaxicola albiloraCinnamon-bellied ground-tyrant, Muscisaxicola capistratusBlack-fronted ground-tyrant, Muscisaxicola frontalisRufous-webbed bush-tyrant, Cnemarchus rufipennisWhite-rumped monjita, Xolmis velatus (V)
White monjita, Xolmis iruperoFire-eyed diucon, Pyrope pyropeGray monjita, Nengetus cinereusBlack-crowned monjita, Neoxolmis coronatusChocolate-vented tyrant, Neoxolmis rufiventrisSalinas monjita, Neoxolmis salinarum (E)
Rusty-backed monjita, Neoxolmis rubetra (E)
Black-billed shrike-tyrant, Agriornis montanusWhite-tailed shrike-tyrant, Agriornis albicaudaGreat shrike-tyrant, Agriornis lividusGray-bellied shrike-tyrant, Agriornis micropterusLesser shrike-tyrant, Agriornis murinusStreak-throated bush-tyrant, Myiotheretes striaticollisFuscous flycatcher, Cnemotriccus fuscatusEuler's flycatcher, Lathrotriccus euleriBlack phoebe, Sayornis nigricansAlder flycatcher, Empidonax alnorumOlive-sided flycatcher, Contopus cooperi (V)
Smoke-colored pewee, Contopus fumigatusEastern wood-pewee, Contopus virens (V)
Tropical pewee, Contopus cinereusShear-tailed gray tyrant, Muscipipra vetulaMany-colored rush tyrant, Tachuris rubrigastraVireos
Order: PasseriformesFamily: Vireonidae

The vireos are a group of small to medium-sized passerine birds. They are typically greenish in color and resemble wood warblers apart from their heavier bills.

Rufous-browed peppershrike, Cyclarhis gujanensisRufous-crowned greenlet, Hylophilus poicilotisChivi vireo, Vireo chiviJays
Order: PasseriformesFamily: Corvidae

The family Corvidae includes crows, ravens, jays, choughs, magpies, treepies, nutcrackers and ground jays. Corvids are above average in size among the Passeriformes, and some of the larger species show high levels of intelligence.

Purplish jay, Cyanocorax cyanomelasAzure jay, Cyanocorax caeruleusPlush-crested jay, Cyanocorax chrysopsSwallows
Order: PasseriformesFamily: Hirundinidae

The family Hirundinidae is adapted to aerial feeding. They have a slender streamlined body, long pointed wings, and a short bill with a wide gape. The feet are adapted to perching rather than walking, and the front toes are partially joined at the base.

Blue-and-white swallow, Pygochelidon cyanoleucaBlack-collared swallow, Pygochelidon melanoleucaTawny-headed swallow, Alopochelidon fucataAndean swallow, Orochelidon andecolaSouthern rough-winged swallow, Stelgidopteryx ruficollisBrown-chested martin, Progne taperaPurple martin, Progne subis (V)
Gray-breasted martin, Progne chalybeaSouthern martin, Progne elegansWhite-winged swallow, Tachycineta albiventerWhite-rumped swallow, Tachycineta leucorrhoaChilean swallow, Tachycineta leucopygaBank swallow, Riparia ripariaBarn swallow, Hirundo rusticaCliff swallow, Petrochelidon pyrrhonotaWrens
Order: PasseriformesFamily: Troglodytidae

The wrens are mainly small and inconspicuous except for their loud songs. These birds have short wings and thin down-turned bills. Several species often hold their tails upright. All are insectivorous.

House wren, Troglodytes aedonMountain wren, Troglodytes solstitialisGrass wren, Cistothorus platensisThrush-like wren, Campylorhynchus turdinusGnatcatchers
Order: PasseriformesFamily: Polioptilidae

These dainty birds resemble Old World warblers in their build and habits, moving restlessly through the foliage seeking insects. The gnatcatchers and gnatwrens are mainly soft bluish gray in color and have the typical insectivore's long sharp bill. They are birds of fairly open woodland or scrub, which nest in bushes or trees.

Creamy-bellied gnatcatcher, Polioptila lacteaMasked gnatcatcher, Polioptila dumicolaDonacobius
Order: PasseriformesFamily: Donacobiidae

The black-capped donacobius is found in wet habitats from Panama across northern South America and east of the Andes to Argentina and Paraguay.

Black-capped donacobius, Donacobius atricapillaDippers
Order: PasseriformesFamily: Cinclidae

Dippers are a group of perching birds whose habitat includes aquatic environments in the Americas, Europe, and Asia. They are named for their bobbing or dipping movements.

Rufous-throated dipper, Cinclus schulziiThrushes
Order: PasseriformesFamily: Turdidae

The thrushes are a group of passerine birds that occur mainly in the Old World. They are plump, soft plumaged, small to medium-sized insectivores or sometimes omnivores, often feeding on the ground. Many have attractive songs.

Speckled nightingale-thrush, Catharus maculatusVeery, Catharus fuscescens (H)
Swainson's thrush, Catharus ustulatusAustral thrush, Turdus falcklandiiYellow-legged thrush, Turdus flavipesPale-breasted thrush, Turdus leucomelasCocoa thrush, Turdus fumigatusRufous-bellied thrush, Turdus rufiventrisCreamy-bellied thrush, Turdus amaurochalinusAndean slaty thrush, Turdus nigricepsBlacksmith thrush, Turdus subalarisChiguanco thrush, Turdus chiguancoGlossy-black thrush, Turdus serranusWhite-necked thrush, Turdus albicollisMockingbirds
Order: PasseriformesFamily: Mimidae

The mimids are a family of passerine birds that includes thrashers, mockingbirds, tremblers, and the New World catbirds. These birds are notable for their vocalizations, especially their ability to mimic a wide variety of birds and other sounds heard outdoors. Their coloring tends towards dull-grays and browns.

Chilean mockingbird, Mimus thencaPatagonian mockingbird, Mimus patagonicusChalk-browed mockingbird, Mimus saturninusWhite-banded mockingbird, Mimus triurusBrown-backed mockingbird, Mimus dorsalisStarlings
Order: PasseriformesFamily: Sturnidae

Starlings are small to medium-sized passerine birds. Their flight is strong and direct and they are very gregarious. Their preferred habitat is fairly open country. They eat insects and fruit. Plumage is typically dark with a metallic sheen.

Crested myna, Acridotheres cristatellus (I)
European starling, Sturnus vulgaris (I)

Old World sparrows
Order: PasseriformesFamily: Passeridae

Sparrows are small passerine birds. In general, sparrows tend to be small, plump, brown or gray birds with short tails and short powerful beaks. Sparrows are seed eaters, but they also consume small insects.

House sparrow, Passer domesticus (I)

Pipits and wagtails
Order: PasseriformesFamily: Motacillidae

Motacillidae is a family of small passerine birds with medium to long tails. They include the wagtails, longclaws, and pipits. They are slender ground feeding insectivores of open country.

Yellowish pipit, Anthus chiiShort-billed pipit, Anthus furcatusPampas pipit, Anthus chacoensis (E)
Correndera pipit, Anthus correnderaOchre-breasted pipit, Anthus nattereriHellmayr's pipit, Anthus hellmayriParamo pipit, Anthus bogotensisFinches
Order: PasseriformesFamily: Fringillidae

Finches are seed-eating passerine birds, that are small to moderately large and have a strong beak, usually conical and in some species very large. All have twelve tail feathers and nine primaries. These birds have a bouncing flight with alternating bouts of flapping and gliding on closed wings, and most sing well.

European greenfinch, Chloris chloris (I)
European goldfinch, Carduelis carduelis (I)
Thick-billed siskin, Spinus crassirostrisHooded siskin, Spinus magellanicusBlack siskin, Spinus atratusYellow-rumped siskin, Spinus uropygialisBlack-chinned siskin, Spinus barbatusGolden-rumped euphonia, Chlorophonia cyanocephalaBlue-naped chlorophonia, Chlorophonia cyaneaPurple-throated euphonia, Euphonia chloroticaGreen-throated euphonia, Euphonia chalybeaViolaceous euphonia, Euphonia violaceaChestnut-bellied euphonia, Euphonia pectoralisSparrows
Order: PasseriformesFamily: Passerellidae

Most of the species are known as sparrows, but these birds are not closely related to the Old World sparrows which are in the family Passeridae. Many of these have distinctive head patterns.

Common chlorospingus, Chlorospingus flavopectusYungas sparrow, Rhynchospiza dabenneiChaco sparrow, Rhynchospiza strigicepsGrassland sparrow, Ammodramus humeralisYellow-browed sparrow, Ammodramus aurifrons (H)
White-browed brushfinch, Arremon torquatusMoss-backed sparrow, Arremon dorbigniiSaffron-billed sparrow, Arremon flavirostrisRufous-collared sparrow, Zonotrichia capensisFulvous-headed brushfinch, Atlapetes fulvicepsYellow-striped brushfinch, Atlapetes citrinellus (E)

Blackbirds
Order: PasseriformesFamily: Icteridae

The icterids are a group of small to medium-sized, often colorful, passerine birds restricted to the New World and include the grackles, New World blackbirds, and New World orioles. Most species have black as the predominant plumage color, often enlivened by yellow, orange, or red.

Bobolink, Dolichonyx oryzivorusWhite-browed meadowlark, Leistes superciliarisPampas meadowlark, Leistes defilippiiLong-tailed meadowlark, Leistes loycaCrested oropendola, Psarocolius decumanusSolitary black cacique, Cacicus solitariusGolden-winged cacique, Cacicus chrysopterusRed-rumped cacique, Cacicus haemorrhousOrange-backed troupial, Icterus croconotusVariable oriole, Icterus pyrrhopterusScreaming cowbird, Molothrus rufoaxillarisGiant cowbird, Molothrus oryzivorusShiny cowbird, Molothrus bonariensisScarlet-headed blackbird, Amblyramphus holosericeusAustral blackbird, Curaeus curaeusChopi blackbird, Gnorimopsar chopiGrayish baywing, Agelaioides badiusUnicolored blackbird, Agelasticus cyanopusYellow-winged blackbird, Agelasticus thiliusChestnut-capped blackbird, Chrysomus ruficapillusSaffron-cowled blackbird, Xanthopsar flavusYellow-rumped marshbird, Pseudoleistes guirahuroBrown-and-yellow marshbird, Pseudoleistes virescensWood-warblers
Order: PasseriformesFamily: Parulidae

The wood-warblers are a group of small, often colorful, passerine birds restricted to the New World. Most are arboreal, but some are terrestrial. Most members of this family are insectivores.

Northern waterthrush, Parkesia noveboracensis (H)
Masked yellowthroat, Geothlypis aequinoctialisAmerican redstart, Setophaga ruticilla (H)
Tropical parula, Setophaga pitiayumiYellow warbler, Setophaga petechia (H)
Blackpoll warbler, Setophaga striata (V)
Flavescent warbler, Myiothlypis flaveolaWhite-browed warbler, Myiothlypis leucoblepharaPale-legged warbler, Myiothlypis signataRiverbank warbler, Myiothlypis rivularisTwo-banded warbler, Myiothlypis bivittataGolden-crowned warbler, Basileuterus culicivorusBrown-capped redstart, Myioborus brunnicepsCardinal grosbeaks
Order: PasseriformesFamily: Cardinalidae

The cardinals are a family of robust, seed-eating birds with strong bills. They are typically associated with open woodland. The sexes usually have distinct plumages.

Hepatic tanager, Piranga flavaScarlet tanager, Piranga olivacea (V)
Red-crowned ant-tanager, Habia rubicaBlack-backed grosbeak, Pheucticus aureoventrisBlackish-blue seedeater, Amaurospiza moestaGlaucous-blue grosbeak, Cyanoloxia glaucocaeruleaUltramarine grosbeak, Cyanoloxia brissoniiTanagers
Order: PasseriformesFamily: Thraupidae

The tanagers are a large group of small to medium-sized passerine birds restricted to the New World, mainly in the tropics. Many species are brightly colored. As a family they are omnivorous, but individual species specialize in eating fruits, seeds, insects, or other types of food. Most have short, rounded wings.

Hooded tanager, Nemosia pileataPlushcap, Catamblyrhynchus diademaGuira tanager, Hemithraupis guiraChestnut-vented conebill, Conirostrum speciosumGiant conebill, Conirostrum binghami (H)
Stripe-tailed yellow-finch, Sicalis citrinaPuna yellow-finch, Sicalis luteaBright-rumped yellow-finch, Sicalis uropygialisCitron-headed yellow-finch, Sicalis luteocephalaGreater yellow-finch, Sicalis auriventrisGreenish yellow-finch, Sicalis olivascensMonte yellow-finch, Sicalis mendozae (E)
Patagonian yellow-finch, Sicalis lebruniSaffron finch, Sicalis flaveolaGrassland yellow-finch, Sicalis luteolaBlack-hooded sierra finch, Phrygilus atricepsGray-hooded sierra finch, Phrygilus gayiPatagonian sierra finch, Phrygilus patagonicusPlumbeous sierra finch, Geospizopsis unicolorAsh-breasted sierra finch, Geospizopsis plebejusMourning sierra finch, Rhopospina fruticetiBand-tailed sierra finch, Rhopospina alaudinaCarbonated sierra finch, Rhopospina carbonaria (E)
Red-backed sierra finch, Idiopsar dorsalisGlacier finch, Idiopsar speculifer (H)
Boulder finch, Idiopsar brachyurusWhite-bridled finch, Melanodera melanoderaYellow-bridled finch, Melanodera xanthogrammaBand-tailed seedeater, Catamenia analisPlain-colored seedeater, Catamenia inornataGray-bellied flowerpiercer, Diglossa carbonaria (H)
Rusty flowerpiercer, Diglossa sittoidesSlaty finch, Haplospiza rustica (H)
Uniform finch, Haplospiza unicolorBlue-black grassquit, Volatinia jacarinaRuby-crowned tanager, Tachyphonus coronatusWhite-lined tanager, Tachyphonus rufusBlack-goggled tanager, Trichothraupis melanopsRed-crested finch, Coryphospingus cucullatusSilver-beaked tanager, Ramphocelus carbo (H)
Brazilian tanager, Ramphocelus bresilius (H)
Coal-crested finch, Charitospiza eucosma (V)
Swallow tanager, Tersina viridisBlue dacnis, Dacnis cayanaLined seedeater, Sporophila lineolaWhite-bellied seedeater, Sporophila leucopteraPearly-bellied seedeater, Sporophila pileataTawny-bellied seedeater, Sporophila hypoxanthaDark-throated seedeater, Sporophila ruficollisMarsh seedeater, Sporophila palustrisRufous-rumped seedeater, Sporophila hypochromaChestnut seedeater, Sporophila cinnamomeaBlack-bellied seedeater, Sporophila melanogaster (V)
Chestnut-bellied seed-finch, Sporophila angolensisYellow-bellied seedeater, Sporophila nigricollis (V)
Double-collared seedeater, Sporophila caerulescensTemminck's seedeater, Sporophila falcirostrisBuffy-fronted seedeater, Sporophila frontalis (H)
Plumbeous seedeater, Sporophila plumbea (H)
Rusty-collared seedeater, Sporophila collarisMany-colored chaco finch, Saltatricula multicolorBluish-gray saltator, Saltator coerulescensGreen-winged saltator, Saltator similisThick-billed saltator, Saltator maxillosusGolden-billed saltator, Saltator aurantiirostrisBlack-throated grosbeak, Saltator fuliginosusBlack-masked finch, Coryphaspiza melanotisGreat Pampa-finch, Embernagra platensisWedge-tailed grass-finch, Emberizoides herbicolaLesser grass-finch, Emberizoides ypiranganusBolivian warbling finch, Poospiza bolivianaCinnamon warbling finch, Poospiza ornata (E)
Black-and-chestnut warbling finch, Poospiza whitiiBlack-and-rufous warbling finch, Poospiza nigrorufaTucuman mountain finch, Poospiza baeri (E)
Rufous-sided warbling finch, Poospizopsis hypochondriaOrange-headed tanager, Thlypopsis sordidaChestnut-headed tanager, Thlypopsis pyrrhocomaRust-and-yellow tanager, Thlypopsis ruficepsRusty-browed warbling finch, Microspingus erythrophrysGray-throated warbling finch, Microspingus cabanisiRinged warbling finch, Microspingus torquatusBlack-capped warbling finch, Microspingus melanoleucusLong-tailed reed finch, Donacospiza albifronsBananaquit, Coereba flaveolaDull-colored grassquit, Asemospiza obscuraSooty grassquit, Asemospiza fuliginosaBlack-crested finch, Lophospingus pusillusGray-crested finch, Lophospingus griseocristatusDiuca finch, Diuca diucaYellow cardinal, Gubernatrix cristataRed-crested cardinal, Paroaria coronataYellow-billed cardinal, Paroaria capitataDiademed tanager, Stephanophorus diadematusCinnamon tanager, Schistochlamys ruficapillus (H)
Magpie tanager, Cissopis leverianusFawn-breasted tanager, Pipraeidea melanonotaBlue-and-yellow tanager, Rauenia bonariensisRufous-bellied mountain tanager, Pseudosaltator rufiventrisBlack-backed tanager, Stilpnia peruviana (H)
Chestnut-backed tanager, Stilpnia preciosaBurnished-buff tanager, Stilpnia cayanaGreen-headed tanager, Tangara seledonRed-necked tanager, Tangara cyanocephala (H)
Sayaca tanager, Thraupis sayacaPalm tanager, Thraupis palmarum''

Notes

References

See also
List of birds
Lists of birds by region

External links
Birds of Argentina and its departments - World Institute for Conservation and Environment

Further reading

Argentina
 
Birds
Argentina